The Mortlock Islands scaly-toed gecko (Lepidodactylus oligoporus) is a species of gecko. It is endemic to Toimon Island in the Federated States of Micronesia.

References

Lepidodactylus
Reptiles described in 2007